Veretskyi Pass or Verecke Pass (more formally: ,) is a mountain pass in Ukraine, one of the most important passes of the Inner Eastern Carpathian Mountains.

Location
The pass is located in the Carpathian Mountains just where the oblasts of Lviv and Transcarpathia meet, on the spine of the Northeastern Carpathians, between the Latorica (or Latorytsia) and Opir river valleys and at the river divide or watershed between the Latorytsia and the Stryi. It has an elevation of 841 meters.

History

The pass has been well-traveled for more than a millennium. In 895 the Hungarian tribes entered the Carpathian Basin and during the next century established the Kingdom of Hungary. In 1241 the main army of the Mongols crossed the pass into the Kingdom of Hungary. In 1703, when Francis Rákóczi II came back from exile at Berezhany Castle in present-day Ukraine, he traveled across Veretskyi Pass into the Hungarian Plain to assume leadership in an anti-Habsburg uprising which became known as Rákóczi's War of Independence. In 1914 during the First World War the pass saw heavy fighting between Austrian-Hungarian troops and those of Tsarist Russia. During World War II the pass was the scene of further battles; the remains of the defensive fortifications of the Árpád Line can still be seen today. Since 1980 the pass has been bypassed by major highways.

In 2008, the Hungarian government received permission from the Ukrainian government to install a monument to the passing of the Hungarian peoples into the future Hungary (in 895). The monument was designed by Hungarian sculptor Péter Matl (Петро Матл) who was born in Mukachevo.

See also
 Hungarian conquest of the Carpathian Basin
 Hungary–Ukraine relations

References

External links

 See a photo and map at Panoramio.

Mountain passes of the Carpathians
Mountain passes of Ukraine